Arnost was a medieval Bishop of Rochester.

Arnost was a monk at Bec Abbey in Normandy France before being selected for the see of Rochester. He was consecrated early 1076. He died about 15 July 1076.

Citations

References
 British History Online Bishops of Rochester accessed on 30 October 2007
 

Bishops of Rochester
11th-century English Roman Catholic bishops
1076 deaths
Anglo-Normans
Year of birth unknown